The Master of Humanities is an interdisciplinary graduate degree which is focused on the humanities (the humanities includes subjects such as history, literature, and philosophy). It is the study of human behavior, practices, and thought. Master of Humanities (MH) degrees have been in existence for at least 40 years; a few online programs exist, as well as traditional on-campus programs offering such degrees.

Program advantages
Many students in MH programs are preparing to teach at the community-college level, enhance their teaching abilities at the high-school level, or are preparing for Ph.D. programs. MH degrees also offer students opportunities in writing and research, government and non-profit work and creative careers.

Degree programs 
Arcadia University (Pennsylvania)
Braniff Graduate School, University of Dallas
University of Colorado at Denver 
Mount Saint Mary's University (Los Angeles)
Old Dominion University (Virginia)
Tiffin University (Ohio) 
Wright State University (Ohio)
California State University-Dominguez Hills
California State University-Northridge
Wilson College (Pennsylvania)
American Public University
University of Texas at Dallas
Marshall University
University of Colorado, Denver  
University of Dallas 
Wilson College 
University of Louisville

References

Master's degrees